USS President was a 12-gun sloop and the second United States Navy ship to carry the name. Her dimensions and builder are unknown, but she was originally purchased by the War Department on Lake Champlain and turned over to the Navy late in 1812. President, together with other suitable craft that had been purchased and built, temporarily gave Americans dominance on Lake Champlain. She served simultaneously but separate from  during the War of 1812. President was captured by the Royal Navy in 1814 and taken into service as HMS Icicle.

References 
 
 

Sloops of the United States Navy
Vessels captured from the United States Navy
War of 1812 ships of the United States
1812 ships